Yannick Reine (born 12 June 1987) is a French kickboxer. He is a WKN World Lightweight kickboxing champion, and the current ISKA World K-1 Super Lightweight champion.

Combat Press ranked him in the Bantamweight top ten between May and July 2019.

Martial arts career
In April 2016, Yannick fought Lorenzo Piras for the WKN European Muaythai Lightweight title. He beat Piras by decision.

In December 2016, Reine fought Soufiane Hammani for the ISKA World K-1 Super Lightweight title. Reine won the fight by unanimous decision.

Yannick participated in the 2017 Konateam Tournament. He beat Sofiane Bougossa by decision in the semifinals, and Youssouf Binate by an extra round decision in the finals, to win the tournament.

He defended his ISKA K-1 title for the first time during Capital Fights 2, when he was scheduled to fight Eddy Nait Slimani. He defeated Slimani by unanimous decision.

Reine fought with K-1 for the first time during Krush 80, when he faced Koya Urabe. Urabe snapped Reine's nine fight winning streak with a unanimous decision win.

Reine had his second ISKA title defense in June 2018, when he fought Arthur Siong. Yannick won the fight by decision.

Reine defended his ISKA title for the third time during Noia Fighters 3, when he fought Unai Caro. He beat Caro by decision.

In March 2020, Reine was scheduled to fight Kim Woo Seung for the WKN World Kickboxing title. He won the fight by a third-round TKO, as Seung suffered a leg injury.

Titles and achievements

 2012 Elite Kickboxing France Champion
 
 2013 Elite Kickboxing France Champion
 
 2013 K-1 France Champion
 
 2014 Elite Kickboxing France Champion
 
 2016 WKN Muaythai Europe -62 kg Champion
 
 2016 ISKA K-1 World -63.5 kg Champion 

 2020 WKN World Kickboxing Lightweight champion

Kickboxing record

|- align="center" bgcolor="#CCFFCC"
| 2020-03-07 || Win  ||align=left| Kim Woo Seung ||  Villejuif Boxing Show 2	 || France || TKO (Leg injury)|| 3 || 
|-
! style=background:white colspan=9 |

|- align="center" bgcolor="#CCFFCC"
| 2019-04-20 || Win  ||align=left| Unai Caro || Noia Fighters 3 || Spain || Decision  || 5 || 3:00
|-
! style=background:white colspan=9 |

|- align="center" bgcolor="#CCFFCC"
| 2019-03-15 || Win  ||align=left| Tristan Benard || Villejuif Boxing Show || France || Decision  || 3 || 3:00

|- align="center" bgcolor="#CCFFCC"
| 2019-01-19 || Win  ||align=left| Daniel Puertas Gallardo || Nuit Des Gladiateurs 10 || France || Decision  || 3 || 3:00

|- align="center" bgcolor="#CCFFCC"
| 2018-06-02 || Win  ||align=left| Arthur Siong || La Nuit Du Kick Boxing III || France || Decision  || 5 || 3:00
|-
! style=background:white colspan=9 |

|- align="center" bgcolor="#FFBBBB"
| 2017-09-08 || Loss ||align=left| Koya Urabe || Krush 80 || Tokyo, Japan || Decision  || 3 || 3:00

|- align="center" bgcolor="#CCFFCC"
| 2017-06-27 || Win ||align=left| Vang Moua || Triumph Fighting Tour || France || TKO (Knees and punches) || 2 ||

|- align="center" bgcolor="#CCFFCC"
| 2017-05-20 || Win ||align=left| Eddy Nait Slimani || Capital Fights 2 || France || Decision || 5 || 3:00 
|-
! style=background:white colspan=9 |

|- align="center" bgcolor="#CCFFCC"
| 2017-04-01 || Win ||align=left| Youssouf Binate || Konateam Tournament, Final || France || Extra Round Decision || 4 || 3:00 
|-
! style=background:white colspan=9 |

|- align="center" bgcolor="#CCFFCC"
| 2017-04-01 || Win ||align=left| Sofiane Bougossa || Konateam Tournament, Semi Final || France || Decision || 3 || 3:00

|- align="center" bgcolor="#CCFFCC"
| 2016-12-10 || Win ||align=left| Soufiane Hammani || Championnat du Monde ISKA || France || Decision || 5 || 3:00 
|-
! style=background:white colspan=9 |

|- align="center" bgcolor="#CCFFCC"
| 2016-05-28 || Win ||align=left| Mikael Peynaud || Cavalaire Kickboxing Show || France || Decision || 3 || 3:00

|- align="center" bgcolor="#CCFFCC"
| 2016-04-23 || Win ||align=left| Lorenzo Piras || The Night of Super Fight 5 || Italy || Decision || 5 || 3:00
|-
! style=background:white colspan=9 |

|- align="center" bgcolor="#CCFFCC"
| 2016-04-09 || Win ||align=left| Gagny Baradji || Partouche Kickboxing Tour || France || Decision || 3 || 3:00

|- align="center" bgcolor="#CCFFCC"
| 2016-01-16 || Win ||align=left| Mustapha Benshimed ||  Muaythaiattitude IV || France || Decision || 3 || 3:00

|- align="center" bgcolor="#FFBBBB"
| 2015-06-12 || Loss ||align=left| Alexy Wallace ||  Strike Fight || France || KO (Spinning back elbow) || 2 || 3:00

|- align="center" bgcolor="#CCFFCC"
| 2015-04-18 || Win ||align=left| Rafi Bohic ||  Konateam Tournament, Final || France || Decision  || 3 || 3:00
|-
! style=background:white colspan=9 |

|- align="center" bgcolor="#CCFFCC"
| 2015-04-18 || Win ||align=left| Sofiane Bougossa ||  Konateam Tournament, Semi Final || France || Decision  || 3 || 3:00

|-  style="text-align:center; background:#FFBBBB;"
| 2014-10-23 || Loss ||align=left| Houcine Bennoui || A1 WCC Lyon, Semi Finals  || Lyon, France || Decision || 3 || 3:00

|-  style="text-align:center; background:#CCFFCC;"
| 2014-05-31 || Win ||align=left| David Douge || FK ONE  || Lyon, France || TKO || 1 ||

|-  style="text-align:center; background:#CCFFCC;"
| 2014-03-29 || Win ||align=left| Christopher Delmotte || Finales Elites De Kick-Boxing  || France || TKO || 3 || 
|-
! style=background:white colspan=9 |

|-  style="text-align:center; background:#CCFFCC;"
| 2014-01-25 || Win ||align=left| Mikael Peynaud || La Ligue des Gladiateurs  || France || Decision || 3 || 3:00

|-  style="text-align:center; background:#CCFFCC;"
| 2013-06-29 || Win ||align=left| Suliman Vazeilles || Finale Championnat de France Elite de K1 Rules  || France || TKO || 2 ||  
|-
! style=background:white colspan=9 |

|-  style="text-align:center; background:#CCFFCC;"
| 2013-04-20 || Win ||align=left| Bertrand Lambert || FK-ONE || France || Decision || 3 || 3:00  
|-
! style=background:white colspan=9 |

|-  style="text-align:center; background:#CCFFCC;"
| 2012-03-31 || Win ||align=left| Gaetan Olivier || 6e Trophée des Etoiles || France || Decision || 3 || 3:00  
|-
! style=background:white colspan=9 |

|-  style="text-align:center; background:#CCFFCC;"
| 2011-11-26 || Win ||align=left| Dada Shezam || La Nuit du Kick Boxing || France || KO || 1 ||

|-
| colspan=9 | Legend:

See also 
List of male kickboxers

References

1987 births
Living people
French male kickboxers
French Muay Thai practitioners